Langford is a village at the west end of the Dengie peninsula close to Maldon in the English county of Essex. It is part of the Wickham Bishops and Woodham ward of the Maldon district.

Its name is derived from the "long ford", referring to the crossing of the River Blackwater that the village grew up around.

History
The place-name 'Langford' is first attested in the Domesday Book of 1086, where it appears as Langheforda. The name means 'long ford'.

Langford was a possession of Beeleigh Abbey until 6 June 1536 when during the Dissolution of the Monasteries, King Henry VIII removed the property from the abbey's ownership.
The Langford and Ulting railway station on the Witham-Maldon branch line was open from 1848 until 1964 when it was closed as part of the Beeching closures.

Religious sites
The local parish church is St. Giles. The exact age of the church is not known, but it is generally considered to be of Norman construction. The church was restored in 1881.

Landmarks

The Museum of Power is located in the former Southend Waterworks Langford Pumping Station. The museum also has a miniature railway, which offers passenger rides.

References

External links

 A local directory with history, current life and photographs of Langford

Villages in Essex